Fredy Alexander Valencia Ramos (born 16 August 2001) is a Colombian footballer who plays as a midfielder for LASK and their reserve team Juniors OÖ.

Career statistics

Club

Notes

References

2001 births
Living people
Colombian footballers
Colombian expatriate footballers
Association football midfielders
Categoría Primera B players
2. Liga (Austria) players
Boca Juniors de Cali footballers
LASK players
FC Juniors OÖ players
Colombian expatriate sportspeople in Austria
Expatriate footballers in Austria
Sportspeople from Antioquia Department